Haft Chah village is one of the functions of Siraf district of Kangan city, where according to the census of 1385 (157) families lived there. This village, together with Laver Gol and Lavarde, together with Shasat Pich, are the most airy parts of Kangan.

References 

Populated places in Jam County